Swallowing Geography is a novel by Deborah Levy, published in 1993 by Jonathan Cape. It was rereleased by Penguin Essentials in 2019.

References

1993 novels
Jonathan Cape books